Janne Martikainen (24 March 1878 – 11 July 1934) was a Finnish politician, born in Kuopio. He was a Member of the Parliament of Finland from 1907 to 1909, representing the Social Democratic Party of Finland (SDP).

References

1878 births
1934 deaths
People from Kuopio
People from Kuopio Province (Grand Duchy of Finland)
Social Democratic Party of Finland politicians
Members of the Parliament of Finland (1907–08)
Members of the Parliament of Finland (1908–09)